Glendale High School is an American high school in the southeast area of Springfield, Missouri, near U.S. Route 65.  Glendale is one of five public high schools in Springfield Public Schools.  In 2010, it had an enrollment of 1,416 students.

Sports

State Championships
 Boys' Golf: 1975, 2007, 2016
 Baseball: 1976, 1978
 Boys' Tennis: 1982
 Girls' Tennis: 1976
 Girls' Golf: 1977, 1978, 1979, 2022
 Girls' Basketball: 1996
 Girls' Swimming: 2013, 2014, 2018
 Boys' Swimming: 2019, 2020, 2021

Ozark Conference Championships
 Boys' Basketball: 1969, 1973, 1974, 1980, 1983, 1986, 1988, 1989, 1990 1991, 1993, 1994, 1999, 2001, 2009, 2012, & 2018
 Girls' Basketball: 1979, 1981, 1982, 1983, 1988, 1991, 1993, 1995, 1996, 1997, 1998, 2000, 2001, 2011, & 2012
 Football: 1964, 1966, 1968, 1969, 1978, 1981, 1982, 1989, 1991, 1992, 1996, 1997, & 2016
 Wrestling: 1970, 1971, 1972, 1974, 1975, 1976, 1977, 1978, 1981 & 1982
 Boys' Soccer: 2019, 2018, 2017, 2016, 2015 2014, 2005, 2004, 2003, 2002, 2001, 2000, 1998, 1997, 1994, 1991, 1990
 Girls' Soccer: 2015, 2013, 2012, 2011, 2009, 2007, 2004, 2003, 1997
 Baseball: 1975, 1976, 1977, 1978, 1985, 1989, 2007, 2008, 2009, 2010, 2013, 2015, 2016, 2017, 2018, & 2019
 Boys' Golf: 1974, 1975, 1976, 1979, 1980, 1983, 1984, 1986, 1993, 1994, 1995, 1997, 1998, 2001, 2002, 2005, 2006, 2007, 2008, 2009, 2014, 2015, 2016, 2017, & 2019
 Girls' Golf: 1969, 1974, 1975, 1976, 1977, 1979, 1981, 1983, 1984, 1986, 1993, 1994, 1995, 1997, 1998, 2001, 2002, 2016, 2018, 2019, & 2020

Music and Arts
The choral students at Glendale have been selected for District, State, Regional and National Honors Choirs. In 2005, the Glendale High School Chamber Choir sang for the National American Choral Directors Convention in Los Angeles, California, and also in St. Louis, Missouri for the 2006 Southwestern Regional ACDA Convention.

Glendale's orchestra has two divisions: the freshman and advanced.

Glendale's band consists of concert, jazz, marching bands. The marching band has performed in numerous bowl parades, the most recent being the 2001 Orange Bowl Parade.

The Glendale Theatre department students have attended the Missouri Fine Arts Academy.

The art department is active in The Memory Project, a program where artists make portraits of underprivileged children around the world in order to foster friendship, caring, and a sense of self-worth

Alumni
 Mark Bailey, former MLB player (Houston Astros, San Francisco Giants)
 Zak Cummings, professional mixed martial artist for the UFC's Welterweight Division
Johnny Morris, founder of American Outdoor store Bass Pro Shops, (class of 1966)
 Steve Rogers, former MLB player (Montreal Expos)
 Tom Whitlock, songwriter and musician, best known for his Academy Award-and Golden Globe-winning song "Take My Breath Away", from the film Top Gun

References

Schools in Springfield, Missouri
Educational institutions established in 1965
Public high schools in Missouri
1965 establishments in Missouri